Vlad Mihai Domșa (born 28 July 2003) is a Romanian professional footballer who plays as a midfielder for Liga I side Argeș Pitești.

References

External links
 

2003 births
Living people
People from Teiuș
Romanian footballers
Association football midfielders
Liga I players
Liga III players
CSM Unirea Alba Iulia players
CS Gaz Metan Mediaș players